Vladimír Ledecký (born 14 February 1966 in Levoča) is a Slovak politician. He is best known for his 21-year tenure as the mayor of the Spišský Hrhov village (1998-2020), which has been internationally recognized for facilitating good cohabitation between Roma minority and Slovak majority. Since 2020 he has served as a Member of the National Council.

Ledecký grew up in Spišský Hrhov. He studied Social Work at the Constantine the Philosopher University in Nitra. He has been active in the area of social entrepreneurship and co-authored several publications on the subject.

In 2019 he was among the founders of the new party For the People led by Andrej Kiska, who was at  time the president of Slovakia. In the 2020 Slovak parliamentary election, Ledecký was elected to parliament. Between July 2020 and April 2021, he was a part of the Government, serving as State Secretary at the Ministry of investments, regional development and informatization. He resigned from the post due to "lack of support for his policies" and subsequently returned to the parliament.

Ledecký is the father of his fellow MP Vladimíra Marcinková.

References 

For the People (Slovakia) politicians
Living people
1966 births
People from Levoča District
Members of the National Council (Slovakia) 2020-present